Tibbs is an English-language patronymic surname from a short form the medieval given names Tebald or Tibalt. Notable people with the name include:

 Andrew Tibbs (1929–1991), American blues singer and songwriter 
 Casey Duane Tibbs (1929–1990), American cowboy actor
 Casey Tibbs (athlete), American Paralympian athlete
 Delbert Tibbs (1939–2013), American man who was wrongfully convicted of murder and rape in 1974
 Gary Tibbs (born 1958), British bass guitarist and actor
 Henry Tibbs (1877–1943), Irish-British Anglican priest
 Jay Tibbs (born 1962), American baseball pitcher
 William Henry Tibbs (1816–1906), American attorney

Fictional characters 
 Miss Tibbs, a character from the sitcom Fawlty Towers
 Virgil Tibbs, from the novel In the Heat of the Night

See also 
 
 Tibbets
 Tibbetts

References 

English-language surnames
Patronymic surnames
Surnames from given names